The Greater London Authority Act 1999 (c. 29) is the Act of Parliament that established the Greater London Authority, the London Assembly and the Mayor of London.

Background 
The Act was brought in after a referendum was held under the Greater London Authority (Referendum) Act 1998 (c. 3). The referendum question was: 'Are you in favour of the Government's proposals for a Greater London Authority, made up of an elected mayor and a separately elected assembly?' The Yes vote was 72.01%, the No vote was 27.99%.

Provisions 
Apart from the main provisions creating the authority and transferring powers to it, it also created a Metropolitan Police Authority for the Metropolitan Police Service, and consequently altered the borders of the Metropolitan Police District to be coterminous with Greater London (excluding the City).

The Act comprises 425 Sections in 12 Parts including 22 named Chapters and 34 Schedules. It was the longest Act to be passed by Parliament since the Government of India Act 1935. The 12 Parts of the Act were:

 Part I The Greater London Authority - Sections 1 to 29
 Part II General Functions and Procedure - Sections 30 to 80
 Part III Financial Provisions - Sections 81 to 140
 Part IV Transport - Sections 141 to 303
 Part V The London Development Agency - Sections 304 to 309
 Part VI Police and Probation Services - Sections 310 to 327
 Part VII The London Fire and Emergency Planning Authority - Sections 328 to 333
 Part VIII Planning - Sections 334 to 350
 Part IX Environmental Functions - Sections 351 to 374
 Part X Culture, Media and Sport - Sections 375 to 386
 Part XI Miscellaneous and General Provisions - Sections 387 to 404
 Part XII Supplementary Provisions - Sections 405 to 425

Amendments 
The Act was amended by the Greater London Authority Act 2007 (2007 c. 24) entitled 'An Act to make further provision with respect to the Greater London Authority; to amend the Greater London Authority Act 1999; to make further provision with respect to the functional bodies, within the meaning of that Act, and the Museum of London; and for connected purposes.'

References

External links
Official text of the Greater London Authority Act 1999 as in force today (including any amendments) within the United Kingdom, from the UK Statute Law Database. (Note: may not be up to date.)

United Kingdom Acts of Parliament 1999
Local government in London
History of local government in London
1999 in London
Acts of the Parliament of the United Kingdom concerning London
Greater London Authority
London Assembly